The 2016 BYU Cougars men's volleyball team represented Brigham Young University in the 2016 NCAA Division I & II men's volleyball season. The Cougars, led by first year head coach Shawn Olmstead, play their home games at Smith Fieldhouse. The Cougars were members of the MPSF and were picked to win the MPSF in the preseason poll.

Season highlights
BYU set a new school record for most sets won consecutive in the rally era. The streak ended at 35 straight sets.

Roster

Schedule
Radio information:
BYU Radio simulcasted all BYUtv games with the BYUtv feed except March 18 against Pepperdine. March 18 against Pepperdine was pulled from BYU Radio so they could broadcast the BYU men's basketball NIT game instead.  
KBEACH broadcast both BYU @ Long Beach State matches live. The radio call will be simulcast on LBSU TV. 
KKEA broadcast both BYU at Hawaii matches live.
Bruin TV broadcast a radio stream of both BYU at UCLA matches.
BYU Radio carried the NCAA Semifinal and Final. 

 *-Indicates conference match.
 x-Indicates MPSF Tournament.
 y-Indicates NCAA Playoffs
 Times listed are Mountain Time Zone.

Announcers for televised games
Loyola-Chicago: Jarom Jordan, Steve Vail, & Lauren Francom
George Mason: Jason Shepherd & David Hyte
Stanford: Jarom Jordan, Steve Vail, & Lauren Francom
Stanford: Jarom Jordan, Steve Vail, & Lauren Francom
Long Beach State: Jacob Fisk
Long Beach State: Jacob Fisk
UC Irvine: No commentators (video only)
UC Irvine: No commentators (video only)
UC Santa Barbara: Jarom Jordan, Steve Vail, & Lauren Francom
UC Santa Barbara: Jarom Jordan, Steve Vail, & Lauren Francom
Princeton: Brittany Smith & Mary Claire Bartlett
Cal Baptist: Chris Velasquez
Cal Baptist: Chris Velasquez
Cal State Northridge: Jarom Jordan, Steve Vail, & Lauren Francom
Cal State Northridge: Jarom Jordan, Steve Vail, & Lauren Francom
Hawai'i: Kanoa Leahey & Chris McLachlin
Hawai'i: Kanoa Leahey & Chris McLachlin
Pepperdine: Jarom Jordan, Steve Vail, & Lauren Francom
Pepperdine: Jarom Jordan, Steve Vail, & Lauren Francom
UC San Diego: Tim Strombel & Ricci Luyties
UC San Diego: Tim Strombel & Ricci Luyties
UCLA: Anne Marie Anderson & Al Scates
UCLA: Denny Cline & Peter Ashley
USC: Jarom Jordan, Steve Vail, & Lauren Francom
USC: Jarom Jordan, Steve Vail, & Lauren Francom
UC Irvine: Jarom Jordan, Steve Vail, & Lauren Francom
UC Santa Barbara: Jarom Jordan, Steve Vail, & Lauren Francom
UCLA: Jarom Jordan, Steve Vail, & Lauren Francom
Long Beach State: Ralph Bednarczyk
Ohio State: Paul Sunderland & Kevin Barnett

References

2016 in sports in Utah
2016 Mountain Pacific Sports Federation volleyball season
2016 NCAA Division I & II men's volleyball season
2016 team